Andrew Kirton is a New Zealand politician who was the General Secretary of the New Zealand Labour Party. He was appointed on 15 January 2016 and took office in April, succeeding Tim Barnett.

Biography

Early life and career
Kirton was born and raised in Taumarunui. He grew up in a Catholic household as one of four children on a dairy farm where his political beliefs were spurred after the value of the farm was halved and farming subsidies were abolished as part of the Rogernomics reforms.

He later moved to the United Kingdom. He holds a Bachelor of Commerce and Management from Lincoln University and later studied at the London School of Economics. Kirton was head of public affairs for Heathrow Airport before joining international construction company, Mace Group, leading their global corporate affairs division.

Political career
Kirton co-chaired the New Zealand University Students' Association and later worked as a communications advisor to former Labour Prime Minister Helen Clark.

In January 2016 he succeeded Tim Barnett as General Secretary of the Labour Party. He was also the Labour Party's Campaign manager for the 2017 general election, serving with Te Atatū MP Phil Twyford, who was the Campaign Chair.

When asked in 2017 if he held aspirations on entering Parliament himself, Kirton did not rule out running one day, but expressed a desire to work in the private sector again first. In June 2018 Kirton announced he was stepping down as General Secretary after accepting a job with Air New Zealand as their head of government relations.

On 1 February 2023 newly appointed Prime Minister of New Zealand Chris Hipkins appointed Kirton as his Chief of Staff, replacing Raj Nahna. He will take office on 7 February 2023.

Personal life
Kirton is married and has three children. His wife Camilla Belich is a lawyer, Labour list MP, and granddaughter of former Wellington mayor Sir Jim Belich. Kirton's uncle Neil Kirton was a New Zealand First MP was Associate Minister of Health from 1996 to 1997. His father Weston Kirton is a two-time mayor of Ruapehu District and ran unsuccessfully as the National Party candidate in Taupo in both the 2002 and 2005 elections.

References

Living people
1981 births
New Zealand Labour Party politicians
Alumni of the University of Lincoln
Alumni of the London School of Economics
People educated at Sacred Heart College, Auckland